The Sons of Zouari are a militant group in Gaza who claim to be responsible for launching incendiary kites and balloons into Israel causing damage to fields and land, during the 2018 Gaza border protests. The group's name is a reference to Hamas’s chief drone expert and engineer . In June 2018, the IAF targeted the car of one of the group's leaders, though the car was empty at the time. The group targets both houses and land. Damage by kites has caused damage to thousands of acres of Israeli farmland near Gaza during the 2018 Gaza border protests.

Motivations 
In an interview with one of the members of the group, when asked about the motivations behind the attacks on the fields the member said "We, as Palestinians, do not recognize these fields as belonging to the enemy. These are our lands, and the fields planted on them are not theirs by right. These are our lands, and we have the right to them. We say to them: We will not let you sow our lands and enjoy them. We will burn your fields, which you harvest to pay for the bullets that you use to shoot children and peaceful unarmed demonstrators."

Citations 

Gaza Strip
Palestinian militant groups